The Granville rail/train disaster occurred on Tuesday 18 January 1977 at Granville, a western suburb of Sydney, New South Wales, Australia, when a crowded commuter train derailed, running into the supports of a road bridge that collapsed onto two of the train's passenger carriages. The official enquiry found the primary cause of the crash to be poor fastening of the track.

It remains the worst rail disaster in Australian history: 83 people died, more than 213 were injured, and 1,300 were affected. An 84th victim, an unborn child, was added to the fatality list in 2017.

Disaster
The train involved in the disaster consisted of eight passenger carriages hauled by 46 class electric locomotive 4620, and had commenced its journey towards Sydney from Mount Victoria in the Blue Mountains at 6:09 a.m. At approximately 8:10 a.m. it was approaching Granville railway station when the locomotive derailed and struck one of the steel-and-concrete pillars supporting the bridge carrying Bold Street over the railway cutting.

The derailed engine and first two carriages passed the bridge. The first carriage, which broke free from the other carriages, was torn open when it collided with a severed mast beside the track, killing eight passengers. The remaining carriages came to a halt with the second carriage clear of the bridge. Within seconds, with all its supports demolished, the bridge and several motor cars on top of it collapsed on top of the carriages, crushing them and the passengers inside.  

Of the total number of passengers travelling in the third and fourth carriages, half were killed instantly when the bridge fell on them, crushing them in their seats. Several injured passengers were trapped in the train for hours after the accident, with part of the bridge crushing a limb or torso. Some had been conscious and lucid, talking to rescuers, but died of crush syndrome soon after the weight was removed from their bodies. This resulted in changes to rescue procedures for these kinds of accidents. Rescuers also faced greater difficulties as the weight of the bridge was still crushing the affected carriages, reducing the space in which they had to work to get survivors out, until it was declared that no one was allowed to attempt further entry until the bridge had been lifted. Soon after, the bridge settled a further  onto the train, trapping two rescuers and crushing a portable generator "like butter".

Another danger came from gas; LPG cylinders were kept year-round on board the train to be used in winter for heating. Several people were overcome by gas leaking from ruptured cylinders. The leaking gas also prevented the immediate use of powered rescue tools. The NSW Fire Brigade provided ventilation equipment to dispel the gas and a constant film of water was sprayed over the accident site to prevent the possibility of the gas igniting.

The train driver, the assistant crewman, the "second man", and the motorists including one motorcyclist driving on the fallen bridge all survived. The operation lasted from 8:12 a.m. Tuesday until 6:00 a.m. Thursday. Ultimately, 84 people were killed in the accident, including an unborn child.

Aftermath
The bridge was rebuilt as a single span without any intermediate support piers. Other bridges similar to the destroyed bridge had their piers reinforced.

The original inquiry into the accident found that the primary cause of the crash was "the very unsatisfactory condition of the permanent way", being the poor fastening of the track, causing the track to spread and allowing the left front wheel of the locomotive to come off the rail. Other contributing factors included the structure of the bridge itself. When built, the base of its deck was found to be one metre lower than the road. Concrete was added on top to build the surface up level with the road. This additional weight significantly added to the destruction of the wooden train carriages. The disaster prompted substantial increases in rail-maintenance expenditure. The train driver, Edward Olencewicz, was exonerated by the inquiry.

The Granville Train Disaster Association Inc. was formed 39 years after the accident to represent those affected. Barry Gobbe, Meredith Knight, the Minister for Transport Andrew Constance, and New South Wales Premier Gladys Berejiklian requested an apology for the way the victims of the disaster were treated by the Wran Government of the day. On 4 May 2017, Berejiklian gave a formal apology to the victims of the disaster, in New South Wales Parliament House.

Memorial

Families and friends of the victims and survivors gather with surviving members of the rescue crews annually. The ceremony ends with the throwing of 84 roses on to the tracks to mark the number of passengers killed. In 2007, a plaque was placed on the bridge to mark the efforts of railway workers who assisted in rescuing survivors from the train.

The original group, known as 'the trust', made submissions on rail safety issues, including recommending that fines for safety breaches be dedicated to rail safety improvements, and campaigning for the establishment of an independent railway safety ombudsman.

Media
 A television docudrama, The Day of the Roses, was produced in 1998 about the accident.
 The Granville Train Disaster: 35 Years of Memories – a 2011 book by B. J. Gobbe, an emergency worker who attended the incident.
 A television documentary, The Train, produced by Graham McNeice from Shadow Productions was aired in 2012 on The History Channel Australia about the accident, and narrated by Brian Henderson.
 Revisiting the Granville Train Disaster of 1977 – a 2017 book by B. J. Gobbe.
 ABC's You Can't Ask That, series 4 episode 8 ("Disaster Survivors"), featured a victim from the accident who spoke about what happened and the long-term impacts on her life.

See also
 Lewisham rail crash (United Kingdom)
 Eschede train disaster (Germany)
 Railway accidents in New South Wales
 Lists of rail accidents

References

External links
 Danger Ahead! Granville, Sydney, Australia

 Documentary on the Granville Train Disaster featuring Rescuer Gary Raymond & Survivor Paul Touzell(9 minute video)
 
 Granville Train Disaster Historians Web page 

Derailments in Australia
Railway accidents and incidents in New South Wales
1977 in Australia
Railway accidents in 1977
Bridge disasters in Australia
Bridge disasters caused by collision
Disasters in Sydney
January 1977 events in Australia
1970s in Sydney
Granville, New South Wales
1977 disasters in Australia